Geraldine Loretta Saunders (September 3, 1923 – February 26, 2019) known under pen name Jeraldine Saunders was an American writer, TV creator/screenwriter and lecturer,

Biography

Saunders was best known as the creator of TV series The Love Boat, an ABC Television series and its associated made-for-TV films portraying the humorous and romantic adventures of various itinerant passengers.  Saunders had worked as a model, an astrologer, an numerologist and palm reader.

The program was based on her 1974 book, The Love Boats, her anecdotal account of her time employed as the first full-time female  cruise director. From 2003 until her death Saunders was the author of Omarr's Astrological Forecast. The nationally syndicated horoscope column, read by hundreds of thousands worldwide,  was originally created by Sydney Omarr, to whom she had been briefly married to, in 1966.

In 1968 Saunders discovered her fiancé, the actor Albert Dekker, dead in his Hollywood home. The death was ruled to be accidental.

References

1923 births
2019 deaths
20th-century American women writers
Writers from Los Angeles
American astrologers
21st-century American women